Allium elegantulum is a species of onions endemic to the province of Liaoning northeastern China. The plant grows on cliffs and in other rocky or sandy places.

Allium elegantulum produces a cluster of narrow bulbs rarely more than 5 mm across. Scapes are up to 20 cm tall, round in cross-section. Tepals are white to pale pink with a darker red midvein.

References

elegantulum
Onions
Flora of Liaoning
Plants described in 1935